Phil Porter (born 1977) is a British playwright, librettist and television writer. He is a graduate of the University of Birmingham.

Plays and libretti
Plays and libretti include:
 Vice Versa (Royal Shakespeare Company, 2017)
 The Miser (West End, 2017, nominated for an Olivier Award for Best New Comedy, adapted with Sean Foley)
 The Man With The Hammer (Plymouth Theatre Royal, 2016)
 The Christmas Truce (Royal Shakespeare Company, 2014)
 A Mad World My Masters (Royal Shakespeare Company, 2013, adapted with Sean Foley)
 Blink (Traverse & Soho / Nabokov, 2012)
 Beauty And The Beast (Unicorn Theatre, 2010)
 Skitterbang Island (Polka Theatre, 2010)
 Here Lies Mary Spindler (Royal Shakespeare Company / Latitude Festival, 2009)
 Cinderella (Unicorn Theatre, 2009)
 The Flying Machine (Unicorn Theatre, 2008)
 The Cracks In My Skin (Manchester Royal Exchange, 2008, winner of a Bruntwood Award)
 Starseeker (adaptation, Northampton Theatre Royal, 2007)
 Pinocchio (Royal Opera House, 2005)
 The Stonewatcher (translation, National Theatre, 2004)
 Stealing Sweets And Punching People (Theatre 503, 2003)
 Smashed Eggs (Pentabus Theatre, 2002, winner of The Children's Award)

References

1977 births
Living people
English writers
Alumni of the University of Birmingham
English male writers